R567 road may refer to:
 R567 road (Ireland)
 R567 road (South Africa)